Saline is a ghost town in Box Elder County, Utah, United States, that is located about  northeast of Promontory Point (cape).

Description
The site is where the Lucin Cutoff intersects the west coast of the peninsula formed where the Promontory Mountains project into the northern Great Salt Lake. The cutoff continues east  to Promontory Point, where it leaves the peninsula.

The community was named for the nearby salt works. While initially an important location along the Lucin Cutoff, as rail service has improved, the town's significance decreased over the century following the construction of the rail line.

See also

 List of ghost towns in Utah

References

Ghost towns in Utah
Populated places in Box Elder County, Utah